The 1934 Monmouth by-election was a by-election held for the British House of Commons constituency of Monmouth in Wales on 14 June 1934.  It was won by the Conservative candidate John Herbert.

Vacancy
The seat had become vacant on when the sitting Conservative Member of Parliament (MP), Sir Leolin Forestier-Walker had died at the age of 68 on 13 May 1934. He had held the seat since the 1918 general election.

Previous result

Candidates
The Conservative candidate was 39-year-old John Arthur Herbert.

The Labour Party candidate was Rev. D Hughes, who had been the unsuccessful candidate at the 1931 general election.

Result
On a reduced turnout, Herbert held the seat for the Conservatives, with a comfortable majority of nearly 10,000 votes. He was re-elected in 1935, but resigned in 1939 to become Governor of Bengal.

See also
Monmouth (UK Parliament constituency)
Monmouth
1939 Monmouth by-election
1945 Monmouth by-election
1991 Monmouth by-election
List of United Kingdom by-elections (1931–1950)

References

By-elections to the Parliament of the United Kingdom in Welsh constituencies
1934 elections in the United Kingdom
1934 in Wales
1930s elections in Wales
20th century in Monmouthshire
June 1934 events
Elections in Monmouthshire
History of Monmouth, Wales